Dieter Klöcker (13 April 1936, Wuppertal – 21 May 2011, Freiburg im Breisgau) was a German clarinetist known for rediscovering many forgotten composers of the 18th century. Specifically forgotten music of the clarinet.

From 1975 to 2002, Klöcker taught clarinet and chamber wind music at the Hochschule für Musik Freiburg. He was the leader of Consortium Classicum with which he also rediscovered the repertoire for Harmonie, a form of historical small wind ensemble. With them in particular he has also amassed an impressive discography.

Publications (selection) 
 Musicological research articles in various journals on Ludwig van Beethoven, Antonio Casimir Cartellieri, Joseph Haydn, Franz Anton Hoffmeister, Giacomo Meyerbeer, Wolfgang Amadeus Mozart, Ignaz Pleyel and others.
Handbuch der Musikpädagogik,  Bd.3 Bärenreiter 1994 Die Klarinette
 Medizinische Probleme bei Instrumentalisten, Laaber Verlag 1995 Ursache und Wirkung
 Kongreßbericht 1997 des Forschungsinstituts für Instrumental- und Gesangspädagogik, Schott 1998 Fehlgeleitete Musikerpotentiale  
 Konzertante Sinfonien, CD-Beiheft EMI 747 98 10 (CDF 671008), 1977/1995
Consortium Classicum: Wolfgang Amadeus Mozart: Harmoniemusiken (3 CDs) – The CDs contain arrangements from Die Entführung aus dem Serail, Die Zauberflöte, La Clemenza di Tito, Die Hochzeit des Figaro and Don Giovanni.

References

1936 births
2011 deaths
German clarinetists
Musicians from Wuppertal
People from the Rhine Province
Academic staff of the Hochschule für Musik Detmold
20th-century German musicians
20th-century clarinetists